The 2019–20 ACF Fiorentina season was the 93rd season in the club's history and their 82nd in the top-flight of Italian football. Having finished 16th the previous season, Fiorentina competed in Serie A and in the Coppa Italia. The season was the first one under the new owner Rocco Commisso, who purchased the club in June 2019.

Players

Squad information

Appearances include league matches only

Transfers

In

Loans in

Out

Loans out

Pre-season and friendlies

Competitions

Serie A

League table

Results summary

Results by round

Matches

Coppa Italia

Statistics

Appearances and goals

|-
! colspan=14 style="background:#9400D3; color:#FFFFFF; text-align:center"| Goalkeepers

|-
! colspan=14 style="background:#9400D3; color:#FFFFFF; text-align:center"| Defenders

|-
! colspan=14 style="background:#9400D3; color:#FFFFFF; text-align:center"| Midfielders

|-
! colspan=14 style="background:#9400D3; color:#FFFFFF; text-align:center"| Forwards

|-
! colspan=14 style="background:#9400D3; color:#FFFFFF; text-align:center"| Players transferred out during the season

Goalscorers

Last updated: 27 June 2020

Clean sheets

Last updated: 8 February 2020

Disciplinary record

Last updated: 8 February 2020

References

ACF Fiorentina seasons
Fiorentina